Derek L. S. Jones (born 1961) is an American Anglican bishop in the College of Bishops of the Anglican Church in North America (ACNA) and the Church of Nigeria (Anglican Communion). Jones would later be received into the ACNA in 2011 after affiliating with the Convocation of Anglicans in North America and Communion of Evangelical Episcopal Churches. He remained a bishop of CANA until its dissolution in 2020.  As the first Bishop of the Diocese of the Armed Forces and Chaplaincy (Church of Nigeria), he also serves as the Bishop of the Armed Forces and Chaplaincy for the Special Jurisdiction of the Armed Forces and Chaplaincy (ACNA). In his position as the Bishop Ordinary, he trains, educates, ordains and directs the activities of all Anglican Chaplains who require formal ecclesiastical endorsement for the ACNA, the Church of Nigeria North American Mission (CONNAM), and other participating Anglican bodies.

In January 2021, Bishop Jones began his tenure as the Executive Director of the Chaplain Alliance for Religious Liberty (CALL). In this role, he regularly partners with First Liberty Institute, Becket Fund for Religious Liberty, and Alliance Defending Freedom (ADF) in defending Religious Liberty in the United States Armed Forces, with particular attention to matters involving chaplains and right of conscience issues.

Given his experience and expertise in areas related to Religious Liberty, Bishop Jones was asked to serve as the Chairman of the newly formed and bi-partisan group called "Our Faith Under Fire" in September 2021.  According to their website, this 501(c)4 was created to address more directly the Religious Liberty, Free Exercise, and right of conscience concerns in our US Armed Forces that have developed in recent years. Our Faith Under Fire released in November 2021 the "Washington Declaration" which addresses the increased intolerance and political indifference toward service members of all faiths seeking to exercise their Constitutionally protected rights. Our Faith Under Fire is currently the only 501(c)4 specifically created to address these matters in our US Armed Forces.

Responsibilities
Chaplains under Bishop Jones' oversight serve in the United States Armed Forces, Veteran's Administration, Department of Justice, and other Federal and State agencies; as well as chaplains serving Hospitals, Hospices, Industry, Education, Law Enforcement and as Community Chaplains.  Bishop Jones works with and through a variety of professional organizations such as the International Conference of Police Chaplains (ICPC), the Association of Clinical Pastoral Education, and the Professional Chaplains Association.

Bishop Jones has served as an endorsing official since his consecration in January 2007 and is the founding bishop of the Anglican Chaplain ministry.  The Deanery for the Chaplaincy (CANA) and the Office of Chaplain Ministry (ACNA) became a joint office in 2010. The Deanery for the Chaplaincy was designated a Diocese of the Church of Nigeria (CANA) in September 2011. As the ministry has continued to grow, the need to modify the Canons of the ACNA became clear and a new canon was adopted in June 2014 whereby a "Special Jurisdiction" was created. In a letter of agreement between the Church of Nigeria (CANA) and the ACNA, the Diocese of the Armed Forces and Chaplaincy functions as the Special Jurisdiction of the Armed Forces and Chaplaincy (JAFC). The Diocese officially changed their corporation name to the Jurisdiction of the Armed Forces and Chaplaincy in 2013 in anticipation of serving the ACNA as the "Special" Jurisdiction.  The Jurisdiction remains an independent ministry and connected to the Church of Nigeria. In the 2019 separation of CANA from formal participation with the ACNA, Bishop Jones elected to remain connected with the College of Bishops of both the ACNA and the Church of Nigeria.

Military career
Bishop Jones retired in 2009 after 28 years of service.  He is a combat veteran fighter pilot having flown the F-16, CF-18, and F-111 fighter aircraft and the T-37 trainer as an Instructor Pilot. His awards include the Combat Air Medal, the Meritorious Service Medal with four oak leaf clusters, and many other individual and unit citations. Bishop Jones has also won numerous “Top Gun” awards. He was one of the last Top Gun award winners in the F-111 before its retirement in 1996.  Bishop Jones was the pictorial subject for the book Superbase 11: RAF Upper Heyford by Jon Davison. He also was the Wing Top Gun for the 27th Fighter Wing while a member of the 524 Fighter Squadron flying F-16s in his last year of flying fighters on active duty in 1998.  From 1998 to 2005, he served as an Instructor Pilot with the Air Force Reserve. His final assignment before retiring in 2009 was as the Reserve Advisor to the Commander and Director of Staff for the Air Force Doctrine Center, collocated at Maxwell AFB and the Pentagon.  In this role, he directed the activities of over 100 geographically separated military personnel in the writing of Air Force and Joint Military Doctrine to include work on Joint Publication 1–05 on Religious Affairs in the DoD.

Civic and National Involvement
Bishop Jones was elected by his peers to serve on the Executive Committee for the National Conference on Ministry to the Armed Forces (NCMAF) in 2011.  In January 2017, he was elected to serve as Chair-elect of that organization and he served as its Chairperson on January 6, 2019 to January 9, 2021. By unanimous Resolution, Bishop Jones is the first to be named "Chair Emeritus" in permanent recognition of his many years of NCMAF leadership. Bishop Jones is also a charter member, and serves on the Executive Board, of the Chaplain Alliance for Religious Liberty (CALL). In January 2020, Bishop Jones was elected to begin serving as the Executive Director of the Chaplain Alliance for Religious Liberty (CALL) beginning in January 2021.

Bishop Jones is considered a key leader on Religious Liberty issues. He has appeared on television, radio, and at conferences as a subject matter expert. He has presented Amicus Briefs on several Religious Liberty court cases, the most significant being the compelling argument of "conscientious objection" that was cited by the SCOTUS and Becket Fund as having helped move to a unanimous decision in the Zubik vs Burwell ("Little Sisters of the Poor") case in 2016. Most recently in 2020, he was the key contributor in an Amicus presented through Becket Fund attorneys in Fulton vs. the City of Philadelphia and is cited on page 18 of the SCOTUS decision in favor of Fulton.

In civic areas, Bishop Jones was selected to serve on the Board of Advisors to the Anglian Institute in 2016. In July 2020, he was elected to the Board for Nashotah House Seminary. Bishop Jones continues to advocate for Air Power and served from 2011 to 2013 as the President of the Birmingham, AL Chapter of the Air Force Association. Bishop Jones is an adjudicator for the United States Pony Club (USPC) and served on the National Quiz Committee for that organization from 1999 to 2011. In January 2010, he was awarded a Presidential Service Citation for his community service and volunteer endeavors; and in 2012, he was named a Distinguished Honorary Alumni of Nashotah House Seminary in Wisconsin. In his off-time, Bishop Jones enjoys working with his horses and outdoor activities.  An accomplished musician and a member of Phi Mu Alpha, he also enjoys vocal performance and little theater.  He is an 'in demand' speaker on topics related to Religious Liberty, and as an academic teaching on Eucharistic Theology.

Citations and References

External links
 Anglican Chaplains Website
 FaceBook for Bishop Jones, Public Figure
 Convocation of Anglicans in North America (CANA) 

1961 births
Living people
Bishops of the Anglican Church in North America
Bishops of the Church of Nigeria
People from Kissimmee, Florida
Anglo-Catholic bishops
Bishops of extra-provincial Anglican churches
American Anglo-Catholics
Anglican realignment people
Samford University alumni